Patricia Fernandez may refer to:

Patricia Fernandez (actress), Filipino TV host, actress, model, and beauty pageant winner
Patricia Fernández, Spanish-born Los Angeles-based artist
Patricia Fernandez (motorcyclist), American motorcycle racer